Alan William Napier-Clavering (7 January 1903 – 8 August 1988), better known as Alan Napier, was an English actor. After a decade in West End theatre, he had a long film career in Britain and later, in Hollywood. Napier is best remembered for portraying Alfred Pennyworth, Bruce Wayne's butler in the 1960s live-action Batman television series.

Early life and career
Napier was a first cousin-once removed of Neville Chamberlain, Britain's prime minister from 1937 to 1940. He was educated at Packwood Haugh School and, after leaving Clifton College, he studied at the Royal Academy of Dramatic Art, graduating in 1925.

He was engaged by the Oxford Players, where he worked with the likes of John Gielgud and Robert Morley. As Napier recalled, his “ridiculously tall” 6′ 6″ height  played a crucial part in his securing the position and also almost losing it. J. B. Fagan had dismissed Tyrone Guthrie because he was too tall for most parts. Napier was interviewed (and accepted) as Guthrie's replacement while sitting down. Fagan realized that Napier was even taller than Guthrie when he stood up, but honoured his commitment. Napier performed for ten years (1929–1939) on the West End stage. Napier described himself as having a particular affinity for the work of George Bernard Shaw, and in 1937 appeared in a London revival of Heartbreak House supervised by Shaw himself.

He made his American stage debut as the romantic lead opposite Gladys George in Lady in Waiting. Though his film career had begun in Britain in the 1930s, he had very little success before the cameras until he joined the British expatriate community in Hollywood in 1941. There he spent time with such people as James Whale, a fellow ex-Oxford Player. He appeared in such films as Random Harvest (1942), Cat People (1942), and The Uninvited (1944). In The Song of Bernadette (1943), he played the ethically questionable psychiatrist who is hired to declare Bernadette mentally ill.  He also played the vicious Earl of Warwick in Joan of Arc (1948).  He performed in two Shakespearean films: the Orson Welles Macbeth (1948), in which he played a priest that Welles added to the story, who spoke lines originally uttered by other characters, and MGM's Julius Caesar (1953), as Cicero. He appeared as Mr. Rutland in the Hitchcock movie Marnie (1964).

In 1949, he made an appearance on the short-lived television anthology series Your Show Time as Sherlock Holmes, in an adaptation of "The Adventure of the Speckled Band". In the 1950s, he appeared on TV in four episodes of Alfred Hitchcock Presents and guest starred on Dale Robertson's NBC western series Tales of Wells Fargo. He had a recurring role as General Steele on the 1962–1963 situation comedy Don't Call Me Charlie!

Batman
In 1965, he was the first to be cast in the Batman TV series, as Bruce Wayne's faithful butler Alfred, a role he played until the series' cancellation in 1968. I had never read comics before [I was hired for Batman]. My agent rang up and said, 'I think you are going to play on "Batman,"' I said 'What is "Batman"?' He said, 'Don't you read the comics?' I said, 'No, never.' He said, 'I think you are going to be Batman's butler.' I said, 'How do I know I want to be Batman's butler?' It was the most ridiculous thing I had ever heard of. He said, 'It may be worth over $100,000.' So I said I was Batman's butler.

Jack Nicholson's version of the Joker in the 1989 film Batman was named Jack Napier in his honor.

Later life and career
Napier's career extended into the 1980s with roles on television, including the miniseries QB VII, The Bastard and Centennial, and the drama The Paper Chase. He retired in 1981, aged 78.

In early 1988, Napier appeared on the late-night talk show The Late Show as part of a reunion of the surviving cast of Batman, despite being in a wheelchair. His co-star Yvonne Craig described the reunion show as overbooked, and when host Ross Shafer finally turned his attention to Napier, it was only to ask him a silly question, then cut him off abruptly as he was telling a story, much to Napier's annoyance. Napier did not participate in the subsequent cast reunion held before his death.

Family
Napier was twice married. His second wife, Aileen Dickens Hawksley, was a great-granddaughter of novelist Charles Dickens. Hawsley's daughter from a previous marriage, actress Jennifer Raine, was the mother of former child actor Brian Forster, best known as "Chris Partridge" on the 1970s television show The Partridge Family.

Death
Napier suffered a stroke in 1987, was hospitalized from June 1988, and had been gravely ill for several days, before his death of natural causes on 8 August 1988, in the Berkeley East Convalescent Hospital in Santa Monica, California. He was 85 years old.

Autobiography

In the early 1970s, Napier wrote a three-volume autobiography which was not published at the time because, as he joked, "I haven't committed a major crime and I'm not known to have slept with any famous actresses." In 2015, McFarland Press published the book under the title Not Just Batman's Butler, with Napier's original text annotated and updated by James Bigwood.

Selected filmography

Film

 Caste (1930) as Capt. Hawtree
 Stamboul (1931) as Bouchier
 In a Monastery Garden (1932) as Count Romano
 Loyalties (1933) as Gen. Canynge
 Wings Over Africa (1936) as Redfern
 For Valour (1937) as General
 The Wife of General Ling (1937) as Governor
 The Four Just Men (1939) as Sir Hamar Ryman
 We Are Not Alone (1939) as Archdeacon
 The Invisible Man Returns  (1940) as Willie Spears
 The House of the Seven Gables (1940) as Fuller
 Confirm or Deny (1940) as Updyke (scenes deleted)
 Eagle Squadron (1942) as Black Watch officer
 A Yank at Eton (1942) as Restaurateur (uncredited)
 Cat People (1942) as Doc Carver (uncredited)
 Random Harvest (1942) as Julian
 Assignment in Brittany (1943) as Sam Wells
 Appointment in Berlin (1943) as Col. Patterson (uncredited)
 Lassie Come Home (1943) as Jock
 Madame Curie (1943) as Dr. Bladh (uncredited)
 The Song of Bernadette (1943) as Dr. Debeau (uncredited)
 Lost Angel (1943) as Dr. Woodring
 The Uninvited (1944) as Dr. Scott
 Action in Arabia (1944) as Eric Latimer
 The Hairy Ape (1944) as MacDougald, Chief Engineer
 Ministry of Fear (1944) as Dr. JM Forrester
 Thirty Seconds Over Tokyo (1944) as Mr. Parker
 Dark Waters (1944) as The Doctor (uncredited)
 Mademoiselle Fifi (1944) as The Count de Breville
 Hangover Square (1945) as Sir Henry Chapman
 Isle of the Dead (1945) as St. Aubyn
 Three Strangers (1946) as David Shackleford
 House of Horrors (1946) as F. Holmes Harmon
 A Scandal in Paris (1946) as Houdon De Pierremont, Police Minister
 The Strange Woman (1946) as Judge Henry Saladine
 Sinbad the Sailor (1947) as Aga
 Fiesta (1947) as The Tourist
 High Conquest (1947) as Tommy Donlin
 Ivy (1947) as Sir Jonathan Wright
 Adventure Island (1947) as Attwater
 Lured (1947) as Detective Gordon
 Driftwood (1947) as Dr. Nicholas Adams
 Unconquered (1947) as Sir William Johnson
 Forever Amber (1947) as Landale
 The Lone Wolf in London (1947) as Monty Beresford
 Johnny Belinda (1948) as Defense Attorney
 Macbeth (1948) as A Holy Father
 Joan of Arc (1948) as Earl of Warwick
 Hills of Home (1948) as Sir George
 Criss Cross (1949) as Finchley
 My Own True Love (1949) as Kittredge
 Tarzan's Magic Fountain (1949) as Douglas Jessup
 A Connecticut Yankee in King Arthur's Court (1949) as High Executioner
 Manhandled (1949) as Alton Bennet
 The Red Danube (1949) as The General
 Challenge to Lassie (1949) as Lord Provost
 Master Minds (1949) as Dr. Druzik
 Tripoli (1950) as Khalil
 Double Crossbones (1951) as Capt. Kidd
 Tarzan's Peril (1951) as Commissioner Peters
 The Great Caruso (1951) as Jean de Reszke
 The Highwayman (1951) as Barton
 Across the Wide Missouri (1951) as Capt. Humberstone Lyon
 The Blue Veil (1951) as Prof. George Carter
 The Strange Door (1951) as Count Grassin
 Big Jim McLain (1952) as Sturak
 Julius Caesar (1953) as Cicero
 Young Bess (1953) as Robert Tyrwhitt
 Désirée (1954) as Despreaux
 Moonfleet (1955) as Parson Glennie
 The Court Jester (1956) as Sir Brockhurst
 Miami Exposé (1956) as Raymond Sheridan
 The Mole People (1956) as Elinu, the High Priest
 Until They Sail (1957) as Prosecution Attorney
 Island of Lost Women (1959) as Dr. Paul Lujan
 Journey to the Center of the Earth (1959) as Dean
 Wild in the Country (1961) as Prof. Joe B. Larson (uncredited)
 Tender Is the Night (1962) as Señor Pardo
 The Premature Burial (1962) as Dr. Gideon Gault
 The Sword in the Stone (1963) as Sir Pellinore (voice)
 Marnie (1964) as Mr. Rutland
 Mary Poppins (1964) as Huntsman / Reporter #3 / Hound (voice, uncredited)
 My Fair Lady (1964) as Gentleman who escorts Eliza to the Queen of Transylvania (uncredited)
 Signpost to Murder (1964) as The Vicar
 36 Hours (1964) as Col. Peter MacLean 
 The Loved One (1965) as English Club Official
 Batman (1966) as Alfred Pennyworth

Television
 Alfred Hitchcock Presents (1955) episode "Into Thin Air" as Geoffrey Toone
 Alfred Hitchcock Presents (1957) episode "I Killed the Count" as Lord Sorrington
 Don't Call Me Charlie! (1962–1963 TV series), recurring role as General Steele
 Twilight Zone (1963) episode "Passage on the Lady Anne" as Capt. Protheroe
 Daniel Boone (1964 TV series) (1965) S1/E26-27 "Cain's Birthday" (Parts 1 & 2) as Col. Sir Hubert Crater
 Daniel Boone (1964 TV series) (1965) S2/E13 "The Perilous Journey" as Lord Brisbane
Batman (1966-1968) as Alfred Pennyworth
 The Beverly Hillbillies (1967) episode "The Clampetts In London" as Chemist
Ironside (1970, 1973, 1974)
 QB VII (1974 miniseries) as Semple
 The Bastard (1978 miniseries) as Dr. Bleeker
 Centennial (1979 miniseries) as Lord Venneford

References

External links

 

Alumni of RADA
English male film actors
English male television actors
English expatriates in the United States
People educated at Clifton College
1903 births
1988 deaths
Burials at Chapel of the Pines Crematory
Male actors from Birmingham, West Midlands
20th-century English male actors
British expatriate male actors in the United States